José Antonio Yudica (February 26, 1936 – August 23, 2021) was an Argentine football player and manager.

Yudica had limited success as a player, winning only two titles during his brief spell at Deportivo Cali. After retirement as a player he took up management, this is where he achieved his most notable successes, leading Quilmes to their first championship after 66 years, winning three Argentine league titles with three clubs (the first manager ever to achieve this), and leading Argentinos Juniors to success in the Copa Libertadores.

Playing career
Yudica had a 16-year career as a player, he started his career at Newell's Old Boys, and went on to play for Argentine giants Boca Juniors, and a number of other teams including Vélez Sársfield, Estudiantes, Platense, Quilmes, Talleres de Remedios de Escalada, San Telmo and Deportivo Cali in Colombia.

Managerial career

After spells with Deportivo Español and Colón Yudica's first major achievement in management was saving struggling Quilmes from relegation in 1977.

He eclipsed this the following season by leading them to their first and only Primera division title; Metropolitano 1978.

After this he won two Second division titles with Quilmes and San Lorenzo.

Yudica made his return to the big time by leading Argentinos Juniors to victory in Nacional. The Copa Libertadores campaign of 1985 was one of the most remarkable in the history of the tournament. Argentinos found themselves in the same 1st round group as fellow Argentinian team Ferro Carril Oeste, at the end of the group the two teams were tied for first place on nine points, this required a playoff, which Argentinos won 3–1.

Argentinos won the 2nd group stage outright, to claim a place in the final against Colombian side América de Cali (fierce rivals of Yudica's former club, Deportivo Cali).

The final was a two legged affair, but both games finished 1–0 to the home team, requiring a cup final playoff but this game ended 1–1, Argentinos Juniors finally triumphed after a 5–4 victory in a penalty shootout.

Yudica led Argentinos to a further international title in 1986 winning the less prestigious Copa Interamericana against Defence Force from Trinidad and Tobago.

After his successes with Argentinos Yudica returned to Newell's Old Boys, the club at which he began his playing career over 30 years before.

He led them to the Primera division title in 1987–88, winning him the unique distinction of becoming the first manager ever to lead three different teams to the Argentine league title.

Later in his career Yudica returned to manage Deportivo Cali, and also had a spell in charge of C.F. Pachuca in Mexico.

Honours

As player
Deportivo Cali
 Primera A (1): 1969
Talleres (RE)
 Primera C (1): 1970
Argentina
 Panamerican Championship (1): 1960

As manager
Quilmes
 Primera División (1): 1978 Metropolitano
San Lorenzo
 Primera B (1): 1982
Argentinos Juniors
 Primera División (1): 1985 Nacional
 Copa Libertadores (1): 1985
 Copa Interamericana (1): 1985
Newell's Old Boys
 Primera División (1): 1987–88
Pachuca
 Primera División A (1): 1995–96

References

External links

 Interview with Yuduca in 2006 
 Details at Historiadeboca 

1936 births
2021 deaths
Argentine footballers
Argentina international footballers
Newell's Old Boys footballers
Boca Juniors footballers
Estudiantes de La Plata footballers
Club Atlético Vélez Sarsfield footballers
Quilmes Atlético Club footballers
Talleres de Remedios de Escalada footballers
Club Atlético Platense footballers
Deportivo Cali footballers
Argentine Primera División players
Categoría Primera A players
Expatriate footballers in Colombia
Argentine expatriate footballers
Footballers from Rosario, Santa Fe
Argentine football managers
Deportivo Español managers
Estudiantes de La Plata managers
Club Atlético Colón managers
Quilmes Atlético Club managers
San Lorenzo de Almagro managers
Unión de Santa Fe managers
Argentinos Juniors managers
Newell's Old Boys managers
Talleres de Remedios de Escalada managers
Deportivo Cali managers
C.F. Pachuca managers
Association football forwards
Pan American Games medalists in football
Pan American Games gold medalists for Argentina
Footballers at the 1955 Pan American Games
Medalists at the 1955 Pan American Games